Gerald Leonard Spence (born January 8, 1929) is a semi-retired American trial lawyer. He is a member of the Trial Lawyer Hall of Fame. Spence has never lost a criminal case before a jury either as a prosecutor or a defense attorney, and has not lost a civil case since 1969.

Background
Spence graduated from the University of Wyoming in 1949 and from the University of Wyoming College of Law in 1952 and was first in his class. He was awarded an honorary Doctor of Laws degree in May 1990. He started his career in Riverton, Wyoming, and later became a successful defense attorney for the insurance industry. Years later, Spence said he "saw the light" and became committed to representing people instead of corporations, insurance companies, banks, or "big business."

From 1954 to 1962 he served as prosecuting attorney of Fremont County, Wyoming.

Gerry Spence and his second wife, Imaging, share their time between their homes in Dubois, Wyoming, and Santa Barbara, California.  Despite having homes in two different states, Spence has stated that he will "die in Wyoming."

High-profile cases

Karen Silkwood
Spence gained attention for the Karen Silkwood case. Karen Silkwood was a chemical technician at the Kerr-McGee plutonium-production plant, where she became an activist and vocal critic of plant safety, also known as a whistleblower. On November 13, 1974, Silkwood died in a one-car crash under suspicious circumstances after reportedly gathering evidence for her union. Spence represented Silkwood's father and children, who charged that Kerr-McGee was responsible for exposing Silkwood to dangerous levels of radiation. Spence won a $10.5 million verdict for the family.

In 1984, the Supreme Court of the United States upheld the family's right to sue under state law for punitive damages from a federally regulated industry. The Silkwood case achieved international fame and was the subject of many books, magazine and newspaper articles and the major motion picture Silkwood starring Meryl Streep as Karen Silkwood.

Other cases
After the Silkwood case, Spence tried a number of high-profile cases. He has not lost a civil case since 1969 and has never lost a criminal case with a trial by jury. He has had several of his more prominent civil verdicts overturned on appeal and lost a 1985 manslaughter case in a bench trial in Newport, Oregon, in December 1985, later prevailing on appeal.

Spence successfully defended Randy Weaver on murder, assault, conspiracy, and gun charges in the  Ruby Ridge, Idaho, federal standoff case, by successfully impugning the conduct of the FBI and its crime lab. Spence never called a witness for the defense. He relied only on contradictions and holes in the prosecution's story. Spence later wrote that he rejected Weaver's anti-Semitic beliefs, but took the case because he believed Weaver had been entrapped into committing a crime and furthermore that federal agents had behaved unconscionably in shooting Weaver's wife and children.

He also successfully defended Ed Cantrell in the Rock Springs, Wyoming, murder case, and he won the acquittal of former Filipino First Lady Imelda Marcos in New York City on federal racketeering charges.

Spence also defended Earth First! founder David Foreman, who in 1990 had been charged with conspiracy for an alleged plot to sabotage a water-pumping station.

On June 2, 2008, Spence obtained an acquittal of Detroit lawyer Geoffrey Fieger, who was charged with making unlawful campaign contributions. Before returning a not-guilty verdict, the federal court jury deliberated 18 hours over four days. The acquittal maintained Spence's record of never having lost a jury trial in a criminal matter.

In civil litigation, Spence won a $52 million verdict against McDonald's Corporation on behalf of a small, family-owned ice cream company.  A medical malpractice verdict of over $4 million established a new standard for nursing care in Utah. In 1992 Spence earned $33.5 million verdicts for emotional and punitive damages for his quadriplegic client after a major insurance company refused to pay on the $50,000 policy.

Mock trial: United States v. Oswald
In 1986, Spence defended Lee Harvey Oswald, the deceased assassin of U.S. President John F. Kennedy, against well-known prosecutor Vincent Bugliosi in a 21-hour televised unscripted mock trial sponsored by London Weekend Television in the United Kingdom. The mock trial involved an actual U.S. judge, a jury of U.S. citizens, the introduction of hundreds of evidence exhibits, and many actual witnesses to events surrounding and including the assassination. The jury returned a guilty verdict. Expressing admiration for his adversary's prosecutorial skill, Spence remarked, "No other lawyer in America could have done what Vince did in this case." The "docu-trial" and his preparation for it inspired Bugliosi's 1600-page book examining the details of the Kennedy assassination and various related conspiracy theories, entitled Reclaiming History, winner of the 2008 Edgar Award for Best Fact Crime. Several times in the book Bugliosi specifically cites his respect for Spence's abilities as a defense attorney as his impetus for digging more deeply into various aspects of the case than he perhaps would have otherwise.

Tort reform activism

During the election season of 2004, Spence, a vocal opponent of tort reform, crisscrossed his native Wyoming spearheading a series of self-funded town hall-style meetings to inform voters of an upcoming ballot measure, Constitutional Amendment D, which would have limited Wyoming citizens' ability to recover compensation if injured by medical malpractice. The ballot measure failed, with a 50.3% "No" vote.

Public interest and television work
For many years, Spence has lectured at law schools and conducted seminars at various legal organizations around the country.

He is the founder and director of the non-profit Trial Lawyers College, where, per its mission statement, lawyers and judges "committed to the jury system" are trained to help achieve justice for individuals fighting "corporate and government oppression", particularly those individuals who could be described as "the poor, the injured, the forgotten, the voiceless, the defenseless and the damned".

Spence is also the founder of Lawyers and Advocates for Wyoming, a non-profit, public interest law firm.

Spence served as legal consultant for NBC television covering the O. J. Simpson trial and has appeared on The Oprah Winfrey Show, Larry King Live, and Geraldo. He briefly had his own talk show on MSNBC, which he hosted from his home in Wyoming.

Spence received the Golden Plate Award of the American Academy of Achievement in 1996.

Later life
After winning the Fieger acquittal in 2008, Spence told jurors, "This is my last case. I will be 80 in January, and it's time for me to quit, to put down the sword." In 2010, Spence was still listed as an active partner in the Spence Law Firm, located in Jackson, Wyoming, and continues to make public appearances. Gerry Spence's next case, a civil suit for wrongful incarceration, ended with a mistrial in December 2012, when the jury could not come to a unanimous decision.
Per the cite to the AP story: "The verdicts Pratt read in court indicated jurors had found in favor of Larsen, Brown and the city of Council Bluffs on both major issues. The first issue was whether Harrington and McGhee's constitutional rights to due process had been violated. The second was whether the city had failed to adequately train and supervise the police officers. When the judge polled the jurors to ensure all agreed, three women said no."
In October 2013, the AP reported that the suit was settled between the two parties four days before a retrial was scheduled to start.

Currently, Mr. Spence oversees The Gerry Spence Method program, which trains trial lawyers who represent injured people and people accused of crimes; no corporate or government lawyers are allowed to attend.

Partial bibliography
Gerry Spence is the author of more than a dozen books, including:
Gunning for Justice - My Life and Trials (Doubleday 1982) 
Of Murder and Madness: A True Story of Insanity and the Law (Doubleday 1983) 
Trial by Fire: The True Story of a Woman's Ordeal at the Hands of the Law (William Morrow 1986)  
With Justice for None: Destroying an American Myth (Times Books 1989) 
From Freedom to Slavery: The Rebirth of Tyranny in America (St. Martin's Press 1993) 
How to Argue & Win Every Time: At Home, At Work, In Court, Everywhere, Everyday (St. Martin's Press 1995) 
The Making of a Country Lawyer (St. Martin's Press 1996) 
O. J.: The Last Word (St. Martin's Press 1997) 
Give Me Liberty: Freeing Ourselves in the Twenty-First Century (St. Martin's Press 1998) 
A Boy's Summer: Fathers and Sons Together (St. Martin's Press June 1, 2000) 
Gerry Spence's Wyoming: The Landscape (St. Martin's Press October 19, 2000) 
Half Moon and Empty Stars (Scribner, 2001) 
Seven Simple Steps to Personal Freedom: An Owner's Manual for Life (St. Martin's Griffin November 1, 2002) 
The Smoking Gun: Day by Day Through a Shocking Murder Trial (Scribner 2003) 
Win Your Case: How to Present, Persuade, and Prevail—Every Place, Every Time (St. Martin's Press 2006) 
Bloodthirsty Bitches and Pious Pimps of Power: The Rise and Risks of the New Conservative Hate Culture (St. Martin's Press 2006) 
The Lost Frontier: Images and Narrative (Gibbs Smith October 1, 2013) 
Police State: How America's Cops Get Away with Murder (St. Martin's Press September 8, 2015) 
Court of Lies (Forge Books February 19, 2019) 
The Martyrdom of Collins Catch the Bear (Seven Stories Press October 6, 2020)

References

Further reading
Wyoming in Profile, Pruett Publishing, Boulder, Colorado, 1981, by Jean Henry Mead.

External links

 Gerry Spence's official website
 Gerry Spence's Blog
 SpenceLawyers.com
 Trial Lawyers College
 Gerry Spence Quotes
 "Spence: $2M settlement underscores loss of freedom"
 Lust for Justice: The Radical Life & Law of J. Tony Serra'', October 22, 2010, by courtroom artist Paulette Frankl, foreword by Gerry Spence
 Dana K. Cole, Gerry Spence's The Smoking Gun As A Teaching Tool (2004)

1929 births
Living people
American legal writers
American political writers
American male non-fiction writers
Criminal defense lawyers
People from Santa Barbara, California
People from Laramie, Wyoming
University of Wyoming alumni
University of Wyoming College of Law alumni
Wyoming lawyers